William Rodney McMullen (born 1961) is an American businessman who has been the CEO of Kroger, the third-largest general retailer in the US, since January 1, 2014.

Early life
McMullen was born in Pineville, Kentucky on his family-owned farm, and was the first of his family to receive a college education. He has a bachelor's and a master's degree in accounting, both from the University of Kentucky.

Career
In 1978, McMullen began working part-time as a stock clerk in his local Kroger grocery store, while a university student. His work included price tagging items, bagging groceries, receiving product, and running the register. In 1982, McMullen moved to Charlotte. From there, he became a financial analyst in the corporate headquarters. At the age of 34, McMullen became chief financial officer. McMullen was key in the merger with Fred Meyer, Inc. in 1999. In 2003, McMullen became vice chairman, and COO in 2009. McMullen became the CEO of Kroger on January 1, 2014, succeeding David Dillon. McMullen received $12m compensation in FY 2018, jumping by 21% to $20.1m for FY2019 due to "a boost in stock awards tied to performance incentives".

McMullen is a non-executive director of Cincinnati Financial.

Compensation

McMullen's salary in 2021 was listed at $1.34 million. The company's median employee salary that year was a bit more than $24,000. This indicates McMullen makes 5,348 percent of the median salary. This is one of the largest wage gaps in America.

His total compensation is much more. In 2020, his salary plus bonuses plus various stock options totaled $20,578,119.

Personal life
He is married to Kathryn King McMullen, whom he met when they were both students at the University of Kentucky.

References

1960s births
Year of birth missing (living people)
Living people
University of Kentucky alumni
Businesspeople from Kentucky
American chief executives